For Love or Money may refer to:

Film and theatre
 For Love or Money, an 1870 stage comedy written by Andrew Halliday
 For Love or Money (play), a 1947 Broadway play by F. Hugh Herbert, adapted for the 1958 film This Happy Feeling
 For Love or Money (1920 film), an American drama film directed by Burton L. King
 For Love or Money (1930 film), an early talkie short starring Lois Wilson
 For Love or Money, an alternative title for the 1933 film Cash
 For Love or Money (1939 film), a film starring June Lang
 For Love or Money (1963 film), a film starring Kirk Douglas
 For Love or Money (1983 film), a film about women and work in Australia
 For Love or Money (1984 film), a TV movie featuring Jamie Farr
 For Love or Money (1993 film), a film starring Michael J. Fox
 For Love or Money (2014 film), a film starring Liu Yifei and Rain
 For Love or Money, a 2019 film starring Robert Kazinsky

Television
 For Love or Money (Australian TV program), a 1987–1989 Australian antiques television program presented by Clive Hale
 For Love or Money (American TV series), a 2003–2004 American reality series aired on NBC
 For Love or Money (Philippine TV series), a 2013–2014 Philippine drama series
 For Love or Money (game show), a 1957–1958 American game show that was broadcast on CBS
 "For Love or Money", an episode of Crime Story
 "For Love or Money", an episode of Dallas
 "For Love or Money", an episode of Dr. Vegas
 "For Love or Money" (Falcon Crest), an episode of Falcon Crest
 "For Love or Money", an episode of Law & Order
 "For Love or Money", an episode of MacGyver
 "For Love or Money", an episode of Night Court
 "For Love or Money", an episode of What I Like About You
 "For Love or Money", an episode of Wildfire
 "For Love or Money", a two-part episode of WKRP in Cincinnati

Literature
 For Love or Money, a Pictorial History of Women and Work in Australia (1983) by Thornley, Oliver and McMurchy
 For Love or Money, a 1995 novel in The Nancy Drew Files series
 For Love or Money, a 1967 novel by Tim Jeal

Music
 "For Love or Money", a song from the 1956 Broadway musical Happy Hunting
 "For Love or Money", a song by Roger Limb on the 1979 compilation album BBC Radiophonic Workshop – 21
 "Love or Money", a song by Joni Mitchell from Miles of Aisles

See also
 Love and Money (disambiguation)
 For the Love of Money (disambiguation)
 Love v Money (disambiguation)
 For Love & Money, a 1989 book by Jonathan Raban
 Love of money